Steffen Zesner  (born 28 September 1967) is a former freestyle swimmer from Germany, who won a total number of four medals as a relay member at the Summer Olympics. His best result was a silver medal, on the 4×200 metres freestyle, alongside Uwe Dassler, Thomas Flemming, and Sven Lodziewski in Seoul, South Korea. He swam for SC Dynamo Berlin and its successor SC Berlin.

References
 
 

1967 births
Living people
German male swimmers
East German male swimmers
Olympic swimmers of East Germany
Olympic swimmers of Germany
Swimmers at the 1988 Summer Olympics
Swimmers at the 1992 Summer Olympics
Swimmers at the 1996 Summer Olympics
Olympic silver medalists for East Germany
Olympic bronze medalists for East Germany
Olympic bronze medalists for Germany
Olympic bronze medalists in swimming
German male freestyle swimmers
World Aquatics Championships medalists in swimming
Medalists at the FINA World Swimming Championships (25 m)
European Aquatics Championships medalists in swimming
Medalists at the 1996 Summer Olympics
Medalists at the 1992 Summer Olympics
Medalists at the 1988 Summer Olympics
Olympic silver medalists in swimming
People from Herzberg (Elster)
Sportspeople from Brandenburg
20th-century German people
21st-century German people